Wycliffe "Wyc" K. Grousbeck (born June 13, 1961) is an American entrepreneur who is the majority owner and Governor of the National Basketball Association's Boston Celtics.

Career
Grousbeck was born in Worcester, Massachusetts and graduated from Noble and Greenough School in Dedham, Massachusetts.  He attended Princeton University, B.A. in history in 1983, and rowed on the 1983 undefeated lightweight crew team that claimed the Ivy League and National rowing championship. He received a J.D. degree from the University of Michigan in 1986 and an M.B.A. in 1992 (Miller Scholar) from the Stanford Graduate School of Business.

After spending seven years as a partner at the venture capital firm, Highland Capital Partners, Grousbeck founded and led the group Boston Basketball Partners L.L.C. that bought the Boston Celtics for $360 million in 2002.  In 2008, the Celtics won their seventeenth NBA Championship.

While continuing his duties with the Celtics, in 2010 Grousbeck became Chairman of the Massachusetts Eye and Ear Infirmary, the world's largest research and clinical hospital specializing in blindness and deafness research. He instituted and led a capital campaign that raised $250 million for Mass Eye and Ear, and led them to join the world class Mass General Brigham medical system, as a first-tier hospital. In 2013, Grousbeck co-founded Causeway Media Partners, LP, a growth equity partnership managing over $330 million, investing in sports technology and media companies such as Omaze, Inc., Zwift, FloSports, Freeletics, Formula E Racing, and SeatGeek.

Wyc married Emilia Fazzalari in January 2017. Wyc and Emilia joined with fellow NBA owners Michael Jordan, Jeanie Buss and Wes Edens to found Cincoro Tequila, which launched to acclaim in September, 2019. Wyc sits on the Executive, Labor, and Media Committees of the NBA, is Board Chair of the Boston Celtics, and Mass Eye and Ear, and is a board member of the Boston Celtics, the Shamrock Foundation, Giving Grousbeck Fazzalari, Omaze, Inc., Cinco Spirits Group, Mass General Brigham, and NBC Sports Boston. 

In 2022, Princeton, in an expansion effort to support additional/diverse students, will open a new Dormitory, Grousbeck Hall, based on gift by Wyc and his family.

References

External links
 Celtics.com profile
 ESPN story

1961 births
Living people
American sports businesspeople
American venture capitalists
Boston Celtics executives
Boston Celtics owners
Businesspeople from Massachusetts
Princeton University alumni
Stanford Graduate School of Business alumni
University of Michigan Law School alumni
People from Worcester, Massachusetts
20th-century American businesspeople
Noble and Greenough School alumni
Basketball people from Massachusetts